Events in the year 2019 in Panama.

Incumbents
President: Juan Carlos Varela (until 1 July), Laurentino Cortizo (starting 1 July)
Vice President: Isabel Saint Malo (until 1 July), Jose Gabriel Carrizo (starting 1 July)

Legislative 
 President of the National Assembly:  Yanibel Abrego

Events

22 to 27 January – The World Youth Day 2019 was celebrated in Panama City

5 May – scheduled date for the 2019 Panamanian general election

Deaths
1 March – Eusebio Pedroza, boxer, WBA featherweight champion  (b. 1956).

References

 
2010s in Panama
Years of the 21st century in Panama
Panama
Panama